Fighting Spiders is a drama television program from Singapore that premiered on MediaCorp Channel 5 on 14 April 2009. The show was created by Ngin Chiang Meng and Jenny Lim.

Plot
Fighting Spiders is the story of three boys in the 1960s — Soon Lee (Edwin Goh), Charlie (Liang Shijie Jason) and Peter (Frederick Fielding) — and their adventure to find the legendary King Spider.

Cast
Andie Chen as Tony Lee
Edwin Goh as Soon Lee 
Liang Shijie Jason as Charlie 
Frederick Fielding as Peter
Rebecca Lim as Susie
Ezann Lee as Annie 
Siona Wu Murphy as Sam
Kimberly Chia as Yi Ling

References

External links
Fighting Spiders on MediaCorp Channel 5

Singaporean television series
2009 Singaporean television series debuts
2009 Singaporean television series endings
Television series about spiders
Channel 5 (Singapore) original programming